Vigala Parish was an Estonian municipality located in Rapla County. It had a population of 1,547 (as of 1 March 2008) and an area of 269.81 km2.

Settlements
Villages
Araste - Avaste - Jädivere - Kausi - Kesu - Kivi-Vigala - Kojastu - Konnapere - Kurevere - Läti - Leibre - Manni - Naravere - Oese - Ojapere - Päärdu - Paljasmaa - Palase - Pallika - Rääski - Sääla - Tiduvere - Tõnumaa - Vaguja - Vanamõisa - Vana-Vigala - Vängla

References

External links